Ottawa is an unincorporated place in Ottawa County, Oklahoma, United States. It is located along State Highway 137 in the central part of the county, approximately five miles east of Miami.

The Spring River flows past 1.5 miles east of the community and the Neosho River is about two miles to the southwest. The Twin Bridges State Park on the Grand Lake o' the Cherokees is four miles south along Route 137.

References

Unincorporated communities in Ottawa County, Oklahoma
Unincorporated communities in Oklahoma